Uwe Tschiskale (born 9 July 1962) is a German former footballer.

Honours
 Bundesliga runner-up: 1987–88

References

1962 births
Living people
German footballers
ASC Schöppingen players
SC Preußen Münster players
SG Wattenscheid 09 players
FC Bayern Munich footballers
FC Schalke 04 players
Bundesliga players
2. Bundesliga players
Association football forwards